The Association Familiale Mulliez (AFM) is the holding company of the Mulliez family. The entrepreneur family originates from around the Lille area of France, and is one of the wealthiest families in the country. AFM was founded in 1955 by Gérard Mulliez and is led by Barthélemy Guislain since 2014.

The Roman Catholic family clan's motto is "Tous dans tout" - literally: "all (family members) in all (businesses)".

Controlled companies 
Via the AFM the family exerts control over the following companies most of which were founded by them:
 Adeo (85%): Hardware stores, DIY shops
 Agapes: System catering
 Alinéa (37%): Furniture stores
 Aquarelle: Women's fashion
 Auchan (84%): Hypermarket-chain
 Boulanger (85%): Electronics stores
 Brice (100%): Clothing for men
 Cannelle: Lingerie
 Cultura: Books, CDs/DVDs, cultural products. It actually belongs to the Sodival holding, which is owned by Mulliez son-in-law Philippe Van der Wees
 Decathlon (85%): Sporting goods retailer, sports stores
 In Extenso: Shoes and clothing
 Jules (previously: Camaïeu homme) (54%): 
 Kiabi: Clothing
 Kiloutou (sold): 
 La Vignery: Wine store
 Leroy Merlin: (home improvement and gardening)
 MacoPharma: Pharmaceutical company
 Orsay: Fashion
 Phildar (100%): Fabric stores, textiles
 Picwic (sold): toy stores
 Pimkie: Young women's and girl's clothing
 Norauto, Midas Europe (10%): Car repairs
 Odyssey: International network of French schools
 Oney (previously: Banque Accord): Financial services, loans
 Saint Maclou (95%): 
 Tape à l'Œil: Fashion
 Top Office: Office equipment
 Youg's: Electronics stores
 Ceetrus: Retail commercial real estate 
 Nodi: Real estate 
 Nhood: Retail services management
 Voltalia

See also
Gérard Mulliez
List of French people by net worth
Hugues Mulliez (Group Chairman at Telecel Group)

External links

References 

Holding companies of France
Business families